Matthew James Hamilton (born February 19, 1989) is an American curler from McFarland, Wisconsin. He is a World Junior Champion, World Men's bronze medalist, and Olympic gold medalist. Hamilton currently plays second for the Duluth, Minnesota-based John Shuster team.

Curling career

2007–2014: Early career 
Hamilton played for skip Jeremy Roe at the 2007 and 2008 United States Men's National Championships, placing seventh and ninth, respectively. In 2008 he also joined Chris Plys' junior team, who had won the National Junior Championship the two previous years. Hamilton helped make it four Junior National Titles in a row for Plys, winning the 2008 and 2009 championships.

As national champions, Hamilton and Team Plys represented the United States at the World Junior Championships. At the 2008 World Juniors in Östersund, Sweden they took home gold medals after beating Sweden's Oskar Eriksson 9–5 in the final.  While in Sweden, Hamilton won the championship's 2008 Sportsmanship Award, an award only given to one male junior curler and one female junior curler.

The following year, at the 2009 World Junior Championships held in the newly completed Vancouver Olympic Centre, they failed to defend their title, ending up with bronze medals. Hamilton and his juniors team also competed at the 2009 United States Olympic Trials, which doubled as that year's national championship, finishing in eighth place with a 3–6 record.

For the 2009–10 season Hamilton returned to Jeremy Roe's team, as third.

In the stages leading up to the 2011 United States Men's Curling Championship, he played as Paul Pustovar's second through the Medford qualifier and the challenge round, eventually qualifying for the Nationals. He replaced Pustovar as skip in the Nationals and finished seventh with a 3–6 win–loss record.

Starting with the 2011–12 curling season, Hamilton joined Craig Brown at third for three seasons.

2014–2018: Gold with Team Shuster 
After the 2014 Winter Olympics, the United States Curling Association held an athlete combine to determine which curlers to include in their High Performance Program (HPP) aimed at having better success at the next Olympics. Hamilton attended the combine but was not chosen as one of the ten male HPP curlers. John Shuster, three-time Olympian at that point, was also not chosen and, in response, created a new team nicknamed "The Rejects", bringing on Hamilton at second, fellow Olympian and combine reject John Landsteiner at lead, and Tyler George at third, who hadn't attended the combine due to his work. They maintained this line-up for four seasons and found great success. As a result of its success, Team Shuster was added to the High Performance Program for 2016.

In Basel, Switzerland they defeated Japan's Yusuke Morozumi in the bronze medal match, earning the first World Men's medal for the United States since 2007. Hamilton attended a second world curling championship this season, representing the United States at the 2017 World Mixed Doubles Championship after he and his sister and doubles partner Becca Hamilton won the US Championship. At the Worlds in Lethbridge, Alberta, they won their group during the round-robin phase and were the second seed going into the playoffs but ultimately ended in tenth place.

Early in his fourth season on Team Shuster, Hamilton won the 2017 United States Olympic Curling Trials with them and then a month later won the 2017 United States Mixed Doubles Curling Olympic Trials with Becca, earning his spot in both curling disciplines for his first Olympics.

In the 2018 Winter Olympics in PyeongChang, the US team lost four of its first six matches and needed to win all of its three remaining matches to qualify for the playoffs, but all of its remaining opponents (Canada, Switzerland, and Great Britain) were currently among the top four teams.  Nevertheless, the US team won all three matches to finish the round-robin in third place with a record of 5–4. In the semifinals, they defeated Canada's Kevin Koe, a two-time world champion, to reach the gold-medal match versus Niklas Edin's team representing Sweden. The gold-medal game was close through seven ends, with the score tied 5–5, but the United States scored five in the eighth end to set up a 10–7 victory. This was the first Olympic gold medal in curling for the United States. In the mixed doubles competition, the Hamilton siblings did not fare as well, finishing in sixth place with a 2–5 record.

2018–present: Post-Olympics 
After the Olympics, George took a break from competitive curling, and Team Shuster replaced him at third with Chris Plys. The slightly revamped team continued winning, taking gold at the 2019 United States Men's Championship. At the 2019 World Men's Championship, they finished in fifth place, having lost to Japan in the first round of playoffs. They defended their United States title at the 2020 United States Men's Championship, defeating Rich Ruohonen in the final to finish the tournament undefeated. The national title would have earned Team Shuster a spot at the final Grand Slam of the season, the Champions Cup, as well as the chance to represent the United States at the 2020 World Men's Curling Championship, but both events were cancelled due to the COVID-19 pandemic.

Team Shuster represented the United States at the 2021 World Men's Curling Championship, which was played in a fan-less bubble in Calgary due to the ongoing COVID-19 pandemic. There, the team led the U.S. to a 10–3 round robin record, in third place. They played Switzerland in the playoffs, in a game which was delayed a day due to some curlers testing positive for the virus. In the game, Switzerland, skipped by Peter de Cruz, beat the Americans to advance to the semifinals.

Personal life
Hamilton works as a research and development technician for Spectrum Brands. He is married and resides in McFarland, Wisconsin. His sister, Becca Hamilton, is also an elite curler. She played with Nina Roth in the women's event at the 2018 Winter Olympics, as well as with Matt in the mixed doubles event.

Hamilton gained notoriety on Twitter after tweets comparing him to video game character Mario in 2018 and Formula One driver Valtteri Bottas in 2022 surfaced.

Teams

Men's

Mixed doubles

References

External links

1989 births
Living people
Sportspeople from Madison, Wisconsin
American male curlers
Continental Cup of Curling participants
Curlers at the 2018 Winter Olympics
Olympic curlers of the United States
Olympic gold medalists for the United States in curling
Medalists at the 2018 Winter Olympics
People from McFarland, Wisconsin
American curling champions
Curlers at the 2022 Winter Olympics